Camponotus divergens is a species of carpenter ant (genus Camponotus) found in Brazil.

References

divergens
Hymenoptera of South America
Insects described in 1887